Jiangkou typically refers to Jiangkou County in Guizhou.

It may also refer to the following locations in China:

Towns 

 Jiangkou, Yingshang County, Anhui
 Jiangkou, Wulong County, in Wulong County, Chongqing
 Jiangkou, Yunyang County, in Yunyang County, Chongqing
 Jiangkou, Jianyang, Fujian (将口镇)
 Jiangkou, Putian, in Hanjiang District, Putian, Fujian
 Jiangkou, Fengkai County, Guangdong
 Jiangkou, Guiping, Guangxi
 Jiangkou, Yongcheng (蒋口镇), Henan
 Jiangkou, Zhijiang, Hubei, in Zhijiang, Hubei
 Jiangkou, Dongkou County, in Dongkou County, Hunan
 Jiangkou, Hengnan County, in Hengnan County, Hunan
 Jiangkou, Xupu County, in Xupu County, Hunan
 Jiangkou, Gan County, in Gan County, Jiangxi
 Jiangkou, Liuba County, in Liuba County, Shaanxi
 Jiangkou, Ningshan County, in Ningshan County, Shaanxi
 Jiangkou, Jiange County, in Jiange County, Sichuan
 Jiangkou, Pengshan County, in Pengshan County, Sichuan
 Jiangkou, Pingchang County, in Pingchang County, Sichuan

Townships 

 Jiangkou Township, Chizhou, in Guichi District, Chizhou, Anhui
 Jiangkou Township, Li County, in Gansu
 Jiangkou Township, Luzhai County, Guangxi

Subdistricts

 Jiangkou Subdistrict, Fenghua, Ningbo, Zhejiang
 Jiangkou Subdistrict, Taizhou, Zhejiang, in Huangyan District, Taizhou, Zhejiang